The 25 July 1899 City of Wellington by-election was caused by the resignation of incumbent MP John Hutcheson over the Marine Scandal. Hutcheson, along with MP Frederick Pirani had accused Premier Richard Seddon and Minister of Marine William Hall-Jones amongst others, of using influence to obtain Mariners certificates for unqualified candidates in contravention of the recent Shipping and Seamen's Act. When the Marine Commission report  declared that the charges were unfounded Hutcheson resigned in order to exonerate himself by means of a by-election win.

1896 election result
General election, 1896 results: City of Wellington

 
 
 
 
 
 
 
 
 
 

1 Majority is difference between lowest winning poll (Fisher, 5859) and highest losing poll (Atkinson, 5831)

2 Turnout is total number of voters - as voters had three votes each total votes cast was higher (37,624)

1899 by-election result
The following table gives the election results:

See also
1898 City of Wellington by-election

Notes

References

Wellington 1899
Politics of the Wellington Region
1899 elections in New Zealand
1890s in Wellington
July 1899 events